Vesa Pulliainen (8 May 1957 – 21 February 2010) was a Finnish footballer. He competed in the men's tournament at the 1980 Summer Olympics.

References

External links
 

1957 births
2010 deaths
Finnish footballers
Finland international footballers
Olympic footballers of Finland
Footballers at the 1980 Summer Olympics
People from Mikkeli
Association football midfielders
Sportspeople from South Savo
Turun Palloseura footballers
Turun Toverit players